Callionymus whiteheadi, Whitehead's deepwater dragonet, is a species of dragonet found in the Pacific waters around Indonesia. The specific name honours the ichthyologist Peter James Palmer Whitehead (1930-1992).

References 

W
Fish described in 1981